Crosstalk is a science fiction novel by Connie Willis, published in 2016. It is a romantic comedy that explores the intersection of telephones and telepathy. In a similar situation to Bellwether and Passage, the main character, Briddey Flannigan, is part of a larger institution who gets caught up in series of escalating events. Additionally, Crosstalk like Bellwether and Passage feature themes of neuroscience, communication and technology.

Plot
Briddey Flannigan, a middle manager in fictional tech-company CommSpan, is dating one of the senior executives, Trent, while fending off nosy family and gossipy colleagues. The company is attempting to find a breakout competitor to the iPhone and other telecommunication products. Trent proposes Briddey and he undergo a new procedure, an EED, which would allow the two of them to feel each other's emotions and take their relationship to the next level. Against the advice of her family and one of her coworkers, Briddey agrees to the procedure, but it has unintended consequences.

Reception
Amal El-Mohtar at NPR Books argued that the book was "not a great showcase" for Connie Willis's oeuvre. However, Eric Brown of The Guardian was more laudatory, writing that "Willis tells a fast-paced tale with well-observed dialogue and some gentle humour."

References

2016 American novels
2016 science fiction novels
American science fiction novels
Novels by Connie Willis
Del Rey books